Trioceros ntunte, the Mount Nyiru chameleon or Nyiru montane chameleon, is a species of chameleon endemic to Kenya.

References

Trioceros
Reptiles described in 2005
Reptiles of Kenya